Fairville is a hamlet in the Town of Arcadia, Wayne County, New York, United States. It is located five miles (8 km) north-northeast of the Village of Newark, at an elevation of 440 feet (134 m). The primary cross roads where the hamlet is located are N.Y. Route 88, Fairville-Maple Ridge Road (CR 232) and Fairville Station Road (CR 233).

The Apple Shed, a longtime farm market and cider mill, is located a mile northwest of Fairville.

External links
Fairville Volunteer Fire Department
The Apple Shed

References

Hamlets in Wayne County, New York
Hamlets in New York (state)
Populated places in Wayne County, New York